Power Finance Corporation Ltd. (P. F. C.) is an Indian central public sector undertaking under the ownership of the Ministry of Power, Government of India. Established in 1986, it is the financial backbone of Indian power sector. PFC's net worth as on 30 September 2018 is INR 383 billion. PFC is the 8th highest profit making Central Public Sector Undertaking (CPSU) as per the Department of Public Enterprises Survey for FY 2017–18. PFC is India's largest NBFC and also India's largest infrastructure finance psu. Government has raised status of PFC from ' Navratna' to 'Maharatna' psu on 12 October 2021.

Initially wholly owned by the Government of India, the company issued an initial public offering in January, 2007. The issue was oversubscribed by over 76 times, which is one of the largest for an IPO of any Indian psu. PFC is listed on the Bombay Stock Exchange (BSE) and the National Stock Exchange (NSE). It is also an ISO 9001:2000 certified company and enjoys the status of Navratna Company in India. On 6 December 2018, the Government of India approved PFC's takeover of REC. The acquisition transaction was completed on 28 March 2019 with PFC paying almost Rs. 14,500 Crs to the Govt. of India for the 52.63% stake.

Organization structure
The corporation is headed by the chairman and managing director, who at present is Ravinder Singh Dhillon. The company has three wings, each headed by a Functional Director namely, Commercial Division, Projects Division and Finance & Financial Operations division. The Commercial Division looks after the credit appraisal and categorization of borrower entities, power sector reforms, review and analysis. The Projects Division controls the operation in various states and project appraisal. Finance  Division looks after the Fund Mobilization and Disbursement. PFC is a lean organization. The number of employees as on 31 March 2019 was around 500.

Borrowings
The major part of PFC's funds is raised through Rupee-denominated bonds. PFC bonds enjoy the highest credit rating in the Indian market and in international markets; they are rated at par with the Indian Sovereign rating. It also borrows short term and long term from various banks and other financial institutions. It has also raised external commercial borrowings (ECB) through private placement in the US market. PFC is one of the institutions eligible for raising funds through capital gain tax bonds under section 54EC of the Income Tax Act, 1961.

Over the last two-three years, PFC has focused on diversifying its borrowing portfolio by raising funds from international markets. In November 2017, PFC launched its main Green Bond issue for US$400 million, which witnessed the tightest ever spread for any Indian Issuer for its maiden 10-year issue. In the first quarter of the Financial year 2020, PFC has raised about US$1.3 billion from the international markets. Out of this US$1 billion was raised in June 2019, which was the first dual and largest USD bonds transaction for Govt owned Indian NBFC. This was also PFC's first borrowing from the international markets after the successful acquisition of REC Limited.

In 2017, PFC was granted approval by the Ministry of Finance, Govt. of India, to raise funds under section 54EC of the Income Tax Act 1961. PFC was the first company to obtain such approval post the budget announcement in February 2017. PFC has raised more than Rs. 1,000 Crs under these bonds since their launch in 2017.

Operations
Since its inception, PFC has been providing financial assistance to power projects across India including generation, transmission, distribution and RM&U projects. Recently, it has forayed into the financing of other infrastructure projects which have backward linkages to the power sector like coal mine development, fuel transportation, oil & gas pipelines, etc. The borrower profile includes State Electricity Boards, State sector power utilities, Central sector power utilities and Private sector companies. PFC is also the nodal agency for the implementation of the ambitious Ultra Mega Power Plants (UMPPs) and the R-APDRP programme of Govt. of India. The company also has the mechanism of rating different state Power Utilities on its performance.

Subsidiary and Associate Companies
PFC presently has ten subsidiary companies. PFC Consulting Ltd. (PFCCL) is a wholly owned subsidiary handling fee based services. The six other companies namely Orissa Integrated Power Limited, Coastal Karnataka Power Limited, Coastal Tamil Nadu Power Limited, Coastal Maharashtra Power Limited, Jharkhand Integrated Power Limited and Akaltara Power Limited, are SPVs (Shell Companies) created for implementing the flagship Ultra Mega Power Projects. After the purchase of the entire holding of the Govt. of India in Rural Electrification Corporation Limited(REC) in FY 2018-19, REC has now become a subsidiary of PFC.

PFC is also one of the promoters in Energy Efficiency Services Limited (EESL), with NTPC, Powergrid and REC being the other promoters. EESL is currently implementing of world's largest energy efficiency portfolio and has been instrumental in energy savings of more than 50 billion kWh/year and an estimated GHG reduction of more than 40 million tonne CO2/year.

Awards & recognitions

Notes

External links

Government-owned companies of India
Indian companies established in 1986
Financial services companies of India
Companies based in New Delhi
Electric power in India
1986 establishments in Delhi
Companies listed on the National Stock Exchange of India
Companies listed on the Bombay Stock Exchange